Kitty Ko Sin Tung (born 1987) is a visual artist from Hong Kong. She is a graduate from the Department of Fine Arts at The Chinese University of Hong Kong. Her art explores the relationship with the urban environment, domestic space, and impact of condition. She is represented by Edouard Malingue Gallery in Hong Kong.

Ko has exhibited at the Central Academy of Fine Arts (CAFA) Art Museum in Beijing, 8th Vladivostok Biennale of Visual Arts, Para Site in Hong Kong, and the Art Museum of the Chinese University of Hong Kong, amongst other locations.

Biography 
She graduated from Chinese University of Hong Kong in 2009.  Ko works as an art teacher on a part-time basis to support herself.

Ko's works include Spectacular sea view (2017), "a rueful spin on a real estate catchphrase associated with multimillion dollar apartments"; One day, workers replaced the traditional high-pressure sodium streetlights with the new LED ones (2017), which grew out of an interest in construction sites; The sun is not here (2015), a series of black-and-white photographs of sunrises that questions how one sees the world through photographs; and ‘Modern Home Collection’ (2013), an array of framed prints of photographed domestic objects collected from ad hoc Internet searches.

In her solo exhibition, Underground Construction: Failed at Edouard Malingue Gallery in 2015, Ko looks at the future of the high-speed railway connecting Hong Kong to Mainland China and explores the personal repercussions of this major development project. She has commented that she is not convinced of the economic value of the rail project and believes it to be part of a plan to assimilate Hong Kong into China. “The government is abusing popular imagination. It makes something look nice on the surface – in this case, the railway link – and tries to convince everyone it is good for Hong Kong,” she told South China Morning Post. Artsy editors have said of the exhibition: "For Ko, contemporary urban life is pervaded by disappointment and alienation as much as it is by expectation and hope for a sense of belonging."

Ko has rejected the label of a "political artist", as she believes her work should be about inner processes rather than political and social commentaries, but admits that the line is blurry.

Of her inspiration, she has said: “My ideas always come from my environment... I have lived in Hong Kong for a long time and I still think there are a lot of things for me to discover and explore there.”

 she has a studio in Fo Tan that she shares with two others.

Exhibitions

Solo exhibitions 
Absent Store, Holy Motors, Hong Kong (2016)

Underground Construction: Failed, Edouard Malingue Gallery, Hong Kong (2015)

A Closed Room, Gallery EXIT, Hong Kong (2014)

Undone, HARDNECK.hk, Hong Kong (2012)

Repairing Space, Blue Lotus Gallery, Hong Kong (2010)

Group exhibitions (selected) 
Rehearsal, Tai Kwun Contemporary, Hong Kong (2018)

Women in Art: Hong Kong, Sotheby's, Hong Kong (2018)

Breathing Space, Asia Society (2017)

Art Basel Hong Kong, Hong Kong Convention and Exhibition Center, Hong Kong (2016)

Underground Construction: Failed, Edouard Malingue Gallery (2015)

Eros, University Museum and Art Gallery, The University of Hong Kong, Hong Kong (2014)

Awards and residencies 
In 2012, Ko completed a residency at the Kunstnarhuset Messen, Ålvik, Norway. John Batten of the South China Morning Post wrote that " This small village allowed Ko to experience slower outlooks on life."

Ko is the recipient of awards including Project Grant (Emerging Artists Scheme) from the Hong Kong Arts Development Council (2014), the Pure Art Foundation Grant 2013–2014 (2014) and Jury’s Special Prize of Huayu Youth Award (2016).

References 

1987 births
Hong Kong women artists
Alumni of the Chinese University of Hong Kong
21st-century women artists
Living people
Hong Kong artists